Bernard (died 1214) was a medieval English Bishop of Carlisle.

Bernard was the custodian of vacant see of Carlisle from about 1200. He was translated from the bishopric of Ragusa to the bishopric of Carlisle on 15 May 1203 by Pope Innocent III. He died about 8 July 1214.

Citations

References

Further reading

 

Bishops of Carlisle
13th-century English Roman Catholic bishops
1214 deaths
Year of birth unknown